is a passenger railway station located in the city of Kawachinagano, Osaka Prefecture, Japan, operated by the private railway operator Nankai Electric Railway. It has the station number "NK68".

Lines

Layout
The station consists of two ground-level opposed side platforms connected by an elevated station building. There is a garage of Nankai Electric Railway in the station south.

Platforms

Adjacent stations

History
Chiyoda Station opened on February 11, 1938.

Passenger statistics
In fiscal 2019, the station was used by an average of 13,435 passengers daily.

Surrounding area
Teragaike
Osaka Chiyoda Junior Colleges

See also
 List of railway stations in Japan

References

External links

 Chiyoda Station from Nankai Electric Railway website  

Railway stations in Japan opened in 1938
Railway stations in Osaka Prefecture
Kawachinagano